The Quitman School District is a public school district based in Quitman, Mississippi (USA).

In addition to Quitman, the district serves the towns of Pachuta, Shubuta, and Stonewall as well as most rural areas in Clarke County.

Schools
Quitman High School (Grades 9-12)
Quitman Junior High School (Grades 6-8)
Quitman Upper Elementary School (Grades 3-5)
Quitman Lower Elementary School (Grades K-2)

Demographics

2006-07 school year
There were a total of 2,294 students enrolled in the Quitman School District during the 2006–2007 school year. The gender makeup of the district was 49% female and 51% male. The racial makeup of the district was 57.45% African American, 42.02% White, 0.26% Hispanic, 0.22% Native American, and 0.04% Asian. 63.1% of the district's students were eligible to receive free lunch.

Previous school years

Accountability statistics

See also
List of school districts in Mississippi

References

External links
 

Education in Clarke County, Mississippi
School districts in Mississippi